Cowgirl's Prayer is the seventeenth studio album by American country artist Emmylou Harris, released on September 28, 1993 by Warner Bros. Records. Coming immediately after 1992's live acoustic At the Ryman album, Cowgirl's Prayer is a collection of similarly subdued material (with a couple of rockers thrown in, notably "High Powered Love", the album's first single). Released at a time when older artists (i.e. anyone over 40) were being dropped from country radio playlists, the album received little airplay, despite positive reviews, and its relative commercial failure is said to have served as a catalyst for Harris' decision to change course with the harder edged sound of her subsequent work, beginning with 1995's rockish Wrecking Ball, thus rendering Cowgirl's Prayer Harris' last mainstream country album.

Despite the lack of radio airplay, accompanying videos for the album's three singles, "High Powered Love", the Cajun-themed "Crescent City", and Jesse Winchester's "Thanks to You", received considerable exposure on CMT.

Track listing

Personnel 

Richard Aspinwall – assistant engineer
Larry Atamanuik – percussion, drums
Sam Bacco – percussion
Grace Bahng – cello
Richard Bennett – acoustic, tremolo, electric guitar, percussion, tambourine, producer, mandocello, hi-string guitar
Mike Brignardello – bass
Lori Brooks – harmony vocals
Sam Bush – fiddle
Kathy Chiavola – handclapping, harmony vocals
Ashley Cleveland – handclapping, harmony vocals
Suzanne Cox – background vocals
Emory Gordy, Jr. – string arrangements
Emmylou Harris – acoustic guitar, harmony vocals
Connie Heard – violin
John Heiden – design
David Hoffner – Hammond organ
Roy Huskey, Jr. – acoustic bass
Kieran Kane – gut string guitar
Mary Ann Kennedy – harmony vocals
Jana King – harmony vocals
Alison Krauss – background vocals
Chris Leuzinger – acoustic and electric guitar
Sam Levine – clarinet, flute
Joe Loesch – special effects
Robin Lynch – art direction
Edgar Meyer – double bass
Mark Miller – engineer, mixing
Al Perkins – pedal steel, steel guitar
Jon Randall – harmony vocals
Allen Reynolds – producer
Pam Rose – harmony vocals
Milton Sledge – percussion, drums
Jay Spell – piano, accordion
Tim White – photography
Hurshel Wiginton – harmony vocals
Kris Wilkinson – viola
Dennis Wilson – harmony vocals
Bobby Wood – organ, electric piano
Bob Wray – bass
Trisha Yearwood – handclapping, harmony vocals

Chart performance

References

External links
 
 

Emmylou Harris albums
1993 albums
Albums produced by Allen Reynolds
Albums produced by Richard Bennett (guitarist)
Warner Records albums